The Land Rover Range Rover Velar (generally known simply as the Range Rover Velar) is a crossover SUV produced by British automotive company Jaguar Land Rover under their Land Rover marque. The fourth model in the Range Rover line, the Velar was unveiled on 1 March 2017 in London, England. The Velar was released in the summer of 2017. The name Velar had previously been used for a series of pre-production first-generation Range Rovers in 1969.

The vehicle received a facelift announced in 2023.

Design

The Range Rover Velar ushers in a new design language for Land Rover that is influenced by Land Rover's previous design language that began with the Evoque and most recently was used in the Range Rover Sport. The new design language features smoother lines on the body, and emphasises sportiness and on-road ability, but more important is the new interior design language that begins with the Velar, which will later spread to other Range Rover models. The interior of the Velar is influenced by that of the I-Pace of 2018 and features 3 touchscreens, which control most of the interior features of the Velar. The cockpit of the Velar is more driver-focused and the seating position is lower than any other Land Rover before, as sportiness and on-road performance are top priorities.

Launch
The Range Rover Velar was first officially revealed in a series of teaser photos on 22 February 2017, and unveiled at an event at the London Design Museum on 1 March 2017. The official launch was at the Geneva Motor Show on 7 March 2017, with it being made available for order shortly after and the first deliveries making it to dealers in the summer of 2017.

Specifications

Platform
Built on the Jaguar Land Rover iQ[AI] (D7a) platform, the Range Rover Velar shares a number of components with the Jaguar F-Pace, XF, and XE models, notably its aluminium platform and  wheelbase. The Velar is built at the same factory in Solihull. However, the Range Rover is  longer than the F-Pace.

Towing capacity 

Engines 
Like its platform-mates, the Range Rover Velar uses Jaguar Land Rover's Ingenium line of four-cylinder diesel and petrol engines in addition to JLR's six-cylinder engines. All 4-cylinder engines are paired with the ZF (8HP45) 8-speed automatic transmission, while all 6-cylinder engines mate with the ZF (8HP70) 8-speed automatic transmission.

References

External links
 Range Rover Velar official website (UK)

Land Rover vehicles
Mid-size sport utility vehicles
Luxury sport utility vehicles
Cars introduced in 2017